Venado is a town and municipality in San Luis Potosí in central Mexico. The name in Spanish means deer.

References

Municipalities of San Luis Potosí